Kadyr Karkabatuly Baikenov (10 October 1944 – 31 August 2022) was a Kazakh engineer and politician. He served as Minister of Energy and Fuel Resources from 1992 to 1994.

Baikenov died on 31 August 2022, at the age of 77.

References

1944 births
2022 deaths
Kazakhstani engineers
Ministers of Energy (Kazakhstan)
Russian Presidential Academy of National Economy and Public Administration alumni
People from East Kazakhstan Region
Recipients of the Order of Kurmet
Recipients of the Order of Parasat